Torrassa is a Barcelona Metro station, in the L'Hospitalet de Llobregat municipality of the Barcelona metropolitan area, and named after the nearby La Torrassa neighbourhood. The station is served by line L1, line L9 and line L10.

The station is located underneath the Avinguda Catalunya, between the carrer d'Almeria and carrer de Rosalía de Castro. There are two entrances, from Avinguda Torrent Gornal and Carrer d'Almeria, which serve a below ground ticket hall.

The station was opened in 1983, at the time of the extension of line L1 from Santa Eulàlia station. It remained the terminus of the line until 1987, when line L1 was further extended to Avinguda Carrilet station.

References

External links

Trenscat.com
TransporteBCN.es
Transports Metropolitans de Barcelona

Barcelona Metro line 1 stations
Barcelona Metro line 9 stations
Barcelona Metro line 10 stations
Railway stations in L'Hospitalet de Llobregat
Railway stations in Spain opened in 1983
Railway stations located underground in Spain